In November 2005 Civil servant David Keogh was charged with offences under section 3, and parliamentary researcher Leo O'Connor under section 5, of the Official Secrets Act 1989 in the United Kingdom. Both men were of Northampton, England.

They appeared on 29 November 2005 in the Bow Street Magistrates' Court in London. They were remanded on bail, to return to the court on 10 January for a committal hearing.

The charges against the pair relate to the alleged leak of a document containing what purports to be a discussion between Tony Blair and George W. Bush at one point. It is alleged this document shows that Blair had to dissuade Bush from bombing Al Jazeera in Qatar.

On 10 January 2006 their defence lawyer was shown the secret Al Jazeera bombing memo and declared it posed no threat to national security. He vowed to have it made public by the court. The case would return to court on 24 January. 

The trial was due to begin on 9 October 2006. However, on that date the judge ruled the hearing should be in secret. It was then reported that the trial itself would begin on 18 April 2007. 

In arguing for the trial to remain secret, the government claimed the memo "could have a serious impact upon the international relations" of the UK. and that the "risk is of such magnitude to outweigh the interest of open public justice."

The trial began on 18 April 2007 in the Old Bailey court. Elaborate procedures were imposed to ensure secrecy, including asking barristers to remove their wigs when restricted information was being discussed. Few details have been published in the press.

On 10 May 2007 Keogh was found guilty on two counts of making a "damaging disclosure" by revealing the memo and was sentenced to 6 months in jail. He was also ordered to pay £5000 in costs to the prosecution. O'Connor was sentenced to 3 months in jail.

Initial BBC report challenged by Blairwatch blog
The original BBC report had claimed that the pair were actually being tried for leaking a different memo, called "Iraq: The Medium Term", which had been published by The Times in 2004. The popular blog BlairWatch argued that a report five days later in the Daily Mirror was in fact correct and that the BBC's source, a government spokesperson, had given the BBC a false story to divert attention from the Al Jazeera bombing memo. 
 Subsequent mainstream news coverage confirmed that the charges concerned the Al Jazeera bombing memo.

See also
 Al Jazeera bombing memo

References

External links

Trials in London
Politics of the United Kingdom
2005 in the United Kingdom
2006 in the United Kingdom
+
2005 in London
2006 in London
Classified information in the United Kingdom